The Masonic Temple—Watts, Ritter, Wholesale Drygoods Company Building in Huntington, West Virginia, which has also been historically known as Watts, Ritter Wholesale Drygoods Company Building and more recently known as River Tower, is a commercial building.  It is located at 1108 Third Avenue, in Huntington, Cabell County, West Virginia. It was built between 1914 and 1922 as a five-story brick building.

The building is constructed of steel-reinforced concrete with yellow and orange brick facing and terra cotta trim, with an additional two stories added in 1926.  It originally housed a large wholesale business with a retail store on the first floor. The Watts, Ritter Wholesale Drygoods Company occupied the building until the firm's closing in 1959.

The building was listed in 1993 on the National Register of Historic Places as "Masonic Temple--Watts, Ritter, Wholesale Drygoods Company Building".

References

Masonic buildings in West Virginia
Commercial buildings on the National Register of Historic Places in West Virginia
Clubhouses on the National Register of Historic Places in West Virginia
Buildings and structures in Huntington, West Virginia
Buildings designated early commercial in the National Register of Historic Places in West Virginia
National Register of Historic Places in Cabell County, West Virginia
1922 establishments in West Virginia
Commercial buildings completed in 1922